This article is about the ethnic groups and population of Honduras.

Population 

The proportion of the population aged below 15 in 2010 was 36.8%, 58.9% were aged between 15 and 65 years of age, and 4.3% were aged 65 years or older.

As of 2014, 60% of Hondurans live below the poverty line. More than 30% of the population is divided between the lower middle and upper middle class, less than 10% are wealthy or belong to the higher social class (most live in Tegucigalpa and San Pedro Sula).

Structure of the population 
Structure of the population (01.07.2007) (estimates) (data refer to projections based on the 2001 Population Census):

Structure of the population (01.07.2010) (estimates):

Vital statistics 
Registration of vital events is in Honduras not complete. The Population Department of the United Nations prepared the following estimates.

Births and deaths

Fertility and births 
Total Fertility Rate (TFR) (Wanted Fertility Rate) and Crude Birth Rate (CBR):

Ethnic groups

Mestizos 
Mestizos (meaning mixed European and Amerindian) have been reported by the CIA World Factbook to be about 87% of the population of Honduras. As in other Latin American countries, the question of racial breakdown of a national population is contentious. Since the beginning of the 20th century at least, Honduras has publicly framed itself as a mestizo nation, along other Latin American countries such as Guatemala or Mexico, ignoring and at times disparaging both the European component of the population and the surviving Amerindian population that was still regarded as "pure blood". It's well known that many Hondurans of European or almost entirely Amerindian background consider themselves mestizo.

Because of social stigmas attached, many Honduran people denied having African ancestry, and after African descended Caribbean workers arrived in Honduras, an active campaign to denigrate all people of African descent, made persons of mixed race anxious to deny any African ancestry. Hence official statistics quite uniformly under-represent those people who have ancestry in favor of a "two race" solution.

Examples of Honduran mestizos are, Poet Clemetina Suarez, novelist and poet Roberto Sosa, footballer Noel Valladares and former president Manuel Zelaya.

Gallery

Amerindian 
The Amerindian population is the largest minority group in Honduras. The largest Amerindian group are the Lencan people. These people have been living in Honduran territory since before the colonization of the Americas, developing their own societies and civilizations. They still have many communities across the country. According to the 2001 census the Amerindian population in Honduras included 381,495 people (6.3% of the total population). With the exception of the Lenca and the Ch'orti' they still keep their language.

Six different Amerindian groups were counted at the 2001 census:
 the Lenca (279,507 in 2001;4.6% of the total population) living in the La Paz, Intibucá, and Lempira departments;
 the Miskito (51,607 in 2001; 0.8%) living on the northeast coast along the border with Nicaragua.
 the Ch'orti' (34,453 in 2001;0.6% of the total population), a Mayan group living in the northwest on the border with Guatemala;
 the Tolupan (also called Jicaque, "Xicaque", or Tol; 9,617 in 2001; 0.2% of the total population), living in the reserve of the Montaña de la Flor and parts of the department of Yoro;
 the Pech or Paya Indians (3,848 in 2001; 0.1% of the total population) living in a small area in the Olancho department;
 the Mayangna or Tawahka (2,463 in 2001; <0.1%) 
Examples of Honduran natives are the many Mayan rules of Copan and other Mayan cities, native leaders as Lempira and Cicumba, and environmental and feminist activist Berta Cáceres.

Gallery

African 

The Afro-Honduran population consist of people of African descent, Garifuna and Creoles. Most of them are descendants of African people brought by the Spanish and other European colonizers between the 16th and 18th centuries. Many of them came from the west African coast, from places like Angola or Senegambia, where European bought slaves for their colonies, while others came from the other colonies in the Caribbean.  
 The Garifuna are descendants of Carib, Arawak, and West African people. This ethnic group has its origins in a group from St. Vincent islands in the Caribbean, who came in 1797. At the 2001 census 46,448 people were registered as Garifuna, 0.8% of the total population of Honduras. The Garifuna speak an Arawakan language. They live along the entire Caribbean coastline of Honduras, and in the Bay Islands.
 The number of Creoles was 12,370 (0.2%) in 2001.

Examples of well-known Afro-Hondurans are footballers David Suazo, Victor "Muma" Bernardez, Dr. Emet Cherefant, and Wilson Palacios.

Gallery

European 

Honduras of European descent or White Hondurans, along with Afro-descendants and Amerindians belong to the minorities of Honduras. Most of the white population are descendants of the Spanish colonists, who mainly came from southern Spain, and inhabit most of the western part of the country. Other populations include descendants of European immigrants who arrived at the beginning of the 20th century. The Italians that gained residence in Honduras were 389 in 2014, nearly all of them concentrated in the capital area. Percentages of whites varied from between 4% to 9%, due to the fact that the majority of Hondurans identify themselves as mestizos, regardless of their ethnic and racial category. Which makes it more difficult to study the number of people who fit into the white category in Honduras. In a census a total of 450,000 of people from Honduras have appeared who identify themselves as whites, therefore it gives the percentage is 4%.

However, other studies report that the percentage could rise much more, reaching close to a half a million white people in Honduras, which according to official national sources would make a percentage of between 5% to 6.9% of whites in Hondurans. This is because the majority of whites in Honduras do not identify themselves as Euro-descendants as such, adopting and feeling more identified with the mestizo identity.

Examples of white Hondurans are ex president Simon Azcona del Hoyo, biomedic Salvador Moncada, film director Juan Carlos Fanconi, politician Roberto Micheletti, General Florencio Xatruch and former president of the Central American federation Don Francisco Morazán Quezada.

Gallery

Other ethnicities

Asians

East Asians 
There's a small Chinese community in Honduras. A lawyer of the Committee for the Defense of Human Rights in Honduras (CODEH) stated that the Chinese community in Honduras is rather small. Many of the Chinese are immigrants who arrived from China after the revolution and their descendants.

Arabs 
Honduras hosts a significant Palestinian community (the vast majority of whom are Christian Arabs). These Arab-Hondurans are sometimes called "Turcos", because they arrived in Honduras using Turkish travel documents, as their homeland was then under the control of the Ottoman Empire. The Palestinians arrived in the country in the late 19th and early 20th centuries, establishing themselves especially in the city of San Pedro Sula. As mentioned earlier, they are also considered whites in the country's censuses, in total the Arab-Hondurans make up 3% of the Honduran population.

Gallery

Other sources of demographic statistics 
Demographic statistics below are based on the 2022 World Population Review.

One birth every 3 minutes	
One death every 12 minutes	
One net migrant every 96 minutes	
Net gain of one person every 3 minutes

Demographic statistics below are based on the CIA World Factbook, unless otherwise indicated.

Population
9,459,440 (2022 est.)

Ethnic groups
Mestizo (mixed Amerindian and European) 90%, Amerindian 7%, African descent 2%, White 1%

Age structure
0-14 years: 30.2% (male 1,411,537/female 1,377,319)
15-24 years: 21.03% (male 969,302/female 972,843)
25-54 years: 37.79% (male 1,657,260/female 1,832,780)
55-64 years: 5.58% (male 233,735/female 281,525)
65 years and over: 5.4% (male 221,779/female 277,260) (2020 est.)

Birth rate
17.92 births/1,000 population (2022 est.) Country comparison to the world: 83rd

Death rate
4.68 deaths/1,000 population (2022 est.) Country comparison to the world: 203rd

Median age
total: 24.4 years. Country comparison to the world: 165th
male: 23.5 years
female: 25.2 years (2020 est.)

Population growth rate
1.19% (2022 est.) Country comparison to the world: 78th

Total fertility rate
2.01 children born/woman (2022 est.) Country comparison to the world: 106th

Mother's mean age at first birth
20.3 years (2011/12 est.)
note: median age a first birth among women 25-49

Net migration rate
-1.34 migrant(s)/1,000 population (2022 est.) Country comparison to the world: 155th

Contraceptive prevalence rate
73.2% (2011/12)

Education expenditures
4.9% of GDP (2019) Country comparison to the world: 68th

Literacy
definition: age 15 and over can read and write
total population: 88.5%
male: 88.2%
female: 88.7% (2019)

School life expectancy (primary to tertiary education)
total: 10 years
male: 10 years
female: 11 years (2019)

Unemployment, youth ages 15-24
total: 17.8%
male: 11.1%
female: 27.7% (2020 est.)

Life expectancy at birth
total population: 75.17 years. Country comparison to the world: 128th
male: 71.63 years
female: 78.82 years (2022 est.)

Urbanization
urban population: 59.6% of total population (2022)
rate of urbanization: 2.48% annual rate of change (2020-25 est.)

Languages
Spanish (official), Amerindian dialects

Religions
Evangelical/Protestant 48%, Roman Catholic 34%, other 1%, none 17% (2020 est.)

See also 
 Languages of Honduras
 Ethnic groups in Central America
 History of Honduras
Hondurans

References 

 
 
Society of Honduras